The Wilkinson County School District is a public school district in Wilkinson County, Georgia, United States, based in Irwinton. It serves the communities of Allentown, Gordon, Danville, Irwinton, Ivey, McIntyre and Toomsboro.

Schools
The Wilkinson County School District has two elementary schools, one middle school, and one high school.

Elementary schools
Wilkinson County Elementary School
Wilkinson County Primary School

Middle school
Wilkinson County Middle School

High school
Wilkinson County High School

References

External links

School districts in Georgia (U.S. state)
Education in Wilkinson County, Georgia